Barlett may refer to:

Donald L. Barlett (born 1936), an American investigative journalist
Barlett-Hann window, a mathematical statistical mass function

See also
Bartlett (disambiguation)